Winters' formula, named after Dr. R.W. Winters, is a formula used to evaluate respiratory compensation when analyzing acid-base disorders and a metabolic acidosis is present. It can be given as

,

where − is given in units of mEq/L and P will be in units of mmHg.

Winters' formula gives an expected value for the patient's P; the patient's actual (measured) P is then compared to this.
If the two values correspond, respiratory compensation is considered to be adequate.
If the measured P is higher than the calculated value, there is also a primary respiratory acidosis.
If the measured P is lower than the calculated value, there is also a primary respiratory alkalosis.

References 

Respiratory therapy
Mathematics in medicine